Jennifer Fox may refer to:
 Jennifer Fox (documentary filmmaker) (born 1959), American documentary film director and producer
 Jennifer Fox (film producer), American fiction film producer